Thierry Arbogast (born 24 January 1956) is a French cinematographer. He was born in Paris. He is known for his work with director Luc Besson on such films as Léon: The Professional (1994), The Fifth Element (1997) and Lucy (2014).

Filmography

References

External links
 

1956 births
French cinematographers
Living people
César Award winners